is a scrolling shooter video game, developed and published by Konami for the Xbox 360 video game console. It is the sequel to the 2008 game Otomedius G (Gorgeous!), a spin-off of the Gradius series. It was released in 2011 on April 21 in Japan and in North America on November 1.

Otomedius Excellent features female characters representing different Konami franchises.

Gameplay
Otomedius Excellent offers a single-player campaign and a multi-player mode provided via the Xbox Live service. If stages are too hard, the player can recruit up to three helpers in the Multiplay offline mode. In Score Attack new weapon cards can be unlocked after finishing the main game. Through Xbox Live online multiplayer was possible and new content could be unlocked. There are also several new characters, several extra stages and several character BGM packs that were available through downloadable content.

Plot
In the year 2011 AD, after the civilization war between the Angel Squadrons and the Gofer Sisters before their memories taken, and the music box has been forbidden (Otomedius Gorgeous). Meanwhile, the Inter-Dimensional Organization G now continues the new Bacterian Army with new member squadrons to defeat the unknown Bacterian Force and the Dark Force was taken to earth and revolved their destruction but the Squadrons were going back in time to finished their most powerful forces among the real world of planet Gradius.

Release 
In July 2011, the first packages of downloadable content (DLC) were released. They featured BGM packs, extra stages and customize Outfits through Xbox Live.

The soundtrack album contains the game's musical tracks from a variety of popular game composers including GEM Impact (Norihiko Hibino and Takahiro Izutani), Motoi Sakuraba, Michiru Yamane, and Shinji Hosoe. The soundtrack also features a large amount of arrangements from previous Konami games. It was released on March 29, 2012 in Japan by Konami, with cover art by Mine Yoshizaki.

Reception 

The review aggregate website, Metacritic, displayed a score of 48/100, which indicates "generally unfavorable reviews". Eric Bowman of GameCritics.com gave the game a 2/10, saying "Otomedius Excellent shouldn't be worth anyone's time. Beyond the overall badness of the gameplay, the whole thing just feels incredibly cynical." Daemon Hatfield of IGN called it "outdated and overpriced," giving the game a 5.5/10.

The difficulty was particularly criticized. Cameron Lewis of Official Xbox Magazine gave it a 5/10, stating "It's frustrating, it makes no sense, and it just makes everyone involved want to play something else." Kevin Schaller of Game Revolution also noted the difficulty, saying "If you think games like Mega Man 9 and 10 are tough, you have no idea just how dead you can be in a game."

References

External links
 

2011 video games
Crossover video games
Gradius video games
Konami games
Parodius
Scrolling shooters
Video games about time travel
Video game sequels
Video games scored by Jake Kaufman
Video games scored by Jeremy Soule
Video games scored by Manabu Namiki
Video games scored by Michiru Yamane
Video games scored by Motoi Sakuraba
Video games scored by Noriyuki Iwadare
Video games scored by Shinji Hosoe
Video games scored by Takahiro Izutani
Video games featuring female protagonists
Video games with 2.5D graphics
Xbox 360 games
Xbox 360-only games
Video games developed in Japan